The year 2011 is the 4th year in the history of DREAM, a mixed martial arts promotion based in Japan. In 2011 DREAM held 4 events beginning with, Dream: Fight for Japan!.

Title fights

Events list

Dream: Fight for Japan!

Dream: Fight for Japan! was an event held on May 29, 2011, at the Saitama Super Arena in Saitama, Saitama, Japan.

Results

Dream: Japan GP Final

Dream: Japan GP Final was an event held on July 16, 2011, at the Ariake Coliseum in Tokyo, Japan.

Results

Dream 17

Dream 17 was an event held on September 24, 2011, at the Saitama Super Arena in Saitama, Saitama, Japan.

Results

Fight For Japan: Genki Desu Ka Omisoko 2011

Fight For Japan: Genki Desu Ka Omisoko 2011 was an event held on December 31, 2011, at the Saitama Super Arena in Saitama, Saitama, Japan.

Results

References

Dream (mixed martial arts) events
2011 in mixed martial arts